Katrina Akursmørk (born 21 October 1996) is a Faroese football defender who plays for KÍ and the Faroe Islands women's national football team.

Honours 

KÍ
1. deild kvinnur: 2012, 2013, 2014, 2015, 2016
Steypakappingin kvinnur: 2012, 2013, 2014, 2015, 2016

References 

1996 births
Living people
Faroese women's footballers
Faroe Islands women's youth international footballers
Faroe Islands women's international footballers
Women's association football defenders
KÍ Klaksvík players